Saint Divitianus was a 3rd-century pre-congregational saint of France.
Bishop of Soissons from about 310 to 320, and grandson of Saint Sinicus.
He died in the first quarter of the 4th century and is thought to have been buried in the Basilica of Abbaye de Saint-Crespin-le-Grand.

His feast day is 5 October.

References

3rd-century Christian saints
Year of birth unknown